"Out Demons Out" is a song and single written by Arthur Grant, Edgar Broughton and Steve Broughton, performed by the Edgar Broughton Band and released in 1970.

Of the Edgar Broughton Band's two hit singles in the UK this was their first. It made 39 on the UK Singles Charts in 1970 staying in the charts for 5 weeks.

Background
1970 was the year the Edgar Broughton Band was tipped for success. Bad management of the group prevented this and they had only two hit singles, neither of which broke into the top 30. The first, "Out Demons Out", has been described as an "audience sing-along, a chant exorcising the evils of the day". When performed live, the song and its chants often had a rousing effects on audiences.

References 

1970 songs
1970 singles
Harvest Records singles
Edgar Broughton Band songs